During President Bill Clinton's first and second terms of office, he nominated 24 people for 20 federal appellate judgeships but the nominees were not processed by the Republican-controlled Senate Judiciary Committee. Three of the nominees who were not processed (Christine Arguello, Andre M. Davis and S. Elizabeth Gibson) were nominated after July 1, 2000, the traditional start date of the unofficial Thurmond Rule during a presidential election year. Democrats claim that Senate Republicans of the 106th Congress purposely tried to keep open particular judgeships as a political maneuver to allow a future Republican president to fill them. Of the 20 seats in question, four were eventually filled with different Clinton nominees, fourteen were later filled with Republican nominees by President George W. Bush and two continued to stay open during Bush's presidency. Senator Harry Reid, the Democratic leader of the United States Senate during the 110th Congress, and Senator Patrick Leahy, the Democratic leader of the Senate Judiciary Committee under Reid, repeatedly mentioned the controversy over President Clinton's court of appeals nominees during the controversy involving the confirmation of Republican court of appeals nominees during the last two years of Bush's second term. Republicans claimed that Democrats were refusing to confirm certain longstanding Bush nominees in order to allow a future Democratic president in 2009 to fill those judgeships.

During his presidency, Clinton also nominated 45 people for 42 federal district judgeships who were never confirmed by the United States Senate and successfully nominated 66 people for appellate judgeships.

List of unsuccessful federal judicial nominations
Clinton made 72 nominations for federal judgeships that were not confirmed by the Senate. Of these, one, Ronnie L. White, was rejected by the Senate, 11 were withdrawn by President Clinton, 10 were withdrawn by President George W. Bush, while the other 50 expired at an adjournment of the Senate, including 32 that were pending at the close of the 106th Congress. Eleven of his unsuccessful nominees were subsequently nominated to federal judgeships by other presidents, and all 11 were confirmed.

Failed appellate nominees
United States Court of Appeals for the Third Circuit
Robert Raymar (of New Jersey), to seat vacated by H. Lee Sarokin - Judgeship later filled by Clinton nominee Maryanne Trump Barry.
Stephen Orlofsky (of New Jersey), to seat vacated by Morton Ira Greenberg - Judgeship later filled by Bush nominee Michael Chertoff.
Robert J. Cindrich (of Pennsylvania), to seat vacated by Timothy K. Lewis - Judgeship later filled by Bush nominee D. Brooks Smith.
United States Court of Appeals for the Fourth Circuit
Andre M. Davis (of Maryland), to seat vacated by Francis D. Murnaghan, Jr. - Davis was nominated on October 6, 2000, during the final months of the Clinton presidency.  The Senate took no action on the nomination, which was returned to the President on December 15, 2000.  After Clinton's unsuccessful nomination of Davis, President George W. Bush unsuccessfully nominated Claude Allen and Rod J. Rosenstein to succeed Judge Murnaghan.  Davis was renominated to the same seat by President Barack Obama in April 2009 and confirmed that year in November.
James A. Beaty, Jr. (of North Carolina), to seat vacated by James Dickson Phillips, Jr. - Judgeship was eventually filled by Obama nominee Albert Diaz of North Carolina.
James A. Wynn, Jr. (of North Carolina), to seat vacated by James Dickson Phillips, Jr. - Judgeship never filled by any Bush nominee; Wynn was renominated by President Barack Obama to the same seat in November 2009 and was confirmed by the Senate in August 2010.
S. Elizabeth Gibson (of North Carolina), to seat vacated by Samuel James Ervin III - Gibson was nominated on October 26, 2000, during the final months of the Clinton presidency.  The Senate took no action on the nomination, which was returned to the President on December 15, 2000.  The judgeship was later filled by Bush nominee Allyson Kay Duncan.
J. Rich Leonard (of North Carolina), to newly created seat - Judgeship later filled by Clinton nominee Roger Gregory (of Virginia) after being renominated by Bush in 2001.
United States Court of Appeals for the Fifth Circuit
Alston Johnson (of Louisiana), to seat vacated by John Malcolm Duhé, Jr. - Judgeship later filled by Bush nominee Edith Brown Clement.
Jorge Rangel (of Texas), to seat vacated by William Lockhart Garwood - Judgeship later filled by Bush nominee Priscilla Owen.
Enrique Moreno (of Texas), to seat vacated by William Lockhart Garwood - Judgeship later filled by Bush nominee Priscilla Owen.
United States Court of Appeals for the Sixth Circuit
Helene White (of Michigan), to seat vacated by Damon Keith - Judgeship later filled by Bush nominee Richard A. Griffin; White was eventually confirmed to the Sixth Circuit when renominated by Bush in 2008.
Kathleen McCree Lewis (of Michigan), to seat vacated by Cornelia Groefsema Kennedy - Judgeship later filled by Bush nominee Susan Bieke Neilson.
Kent Markus (of Ohio), to seat vacated by David Aldrich Nelson - Judgeship later filled by Bush nominee Jeffrey S. Sutton.
United States Court of Appeals for the Eighth Circuit
Bonnie Campbell (of Iowa), to seat vacated by George Gardner Fagg - Judgeship later filled by Bush nominee Michael J. Melloy.
United States Court of Appeals for the Ninth Circuit
James Ware (of California), to seat vacated by J. Clifford Wallace - Judgeship later filled by Clinton nominee Kim McLane Wardlaw.
Barry Goode (of California), to seat vacated by Charles E. Wiggins - Judgeship later filled by Bush nominee Carlos Bea.
James E. Duffy, Jr. (of Hawaii), to seat vacated by Cynthia Holcomb Hall (of California) - Judgeship later filled by Bush nominee Richard Clifton (of Hawaii).
United States Court of Appeals for the Tenth Circuit
James Lyons (of Colorado), to seat vacated by John Carbone Porfilio - Lyons was nominated on September 22, 1999.  Both Senators from Colorado, Ben Nighthorse Campbell and Wayne Allard, were members of the Republican Party.  Senator Campbell was supportive of the Lyons nomination, but Allard withheld his support and described Lyons as a "political operative" due to his representation of the Clintons during Whitewater.  Lyons' nomination was withdrawn on June 6, 2000.  Clinton subsequently nominated Christine Arguello, also unsuccessfully.  The judgeship was later filled by Bush nominee Timothy M. Tymkovich.
Christine Arguello (of Colorado), to seat vacated by John Carbone Porfilio - Arguello was nominated on July 27, 2000, shortly after Clinton withdrew his earlier nomination of James Lyons.  The Senate took no action on the nomination, which was returned to the President on December 15, 2000.  The judgeship was later filled by Bush nominee Timothy M. Tymkovich.  Arguello was eventually confirmed to a district court seat when nominated by Bush in 2008.
United States Court of Appeals for the Eleventh Circuit
Charles "Bud" Stack (of Florida), to seat vacated by Peter T. Fay - Judgeship later filled by Clinton nominee Stanley Marcus.
United States Court of Appeals for the District of Columbia
Elena Kagan (of the District of Columbia), to seat vacated by James L. Buckley - Judgeship later filled by Bush nominee John G. Roberts, Jr.
Allen Snyder (of Maryland), to seat vacated by Patricia Wald - Judgeship later filled by Bush nominee Thomas B. Griffith.

Others who were nominated or considered for nomination to federal appellate courts

While not a controversy, one other Clinton appellate court nominee, Barbara Durham, withdrew before being confirmed, but not because of Republican opposition.  Rather, Durham, a conservative jurist whom Clinton nominated to the United States Court of Appeals for the Ninth Circuit as part of a deal with then-Washington Sen. Slade Gorton, withdrew because of illness.  Clinton instead nominated Republican lawyer Richard Tallman of Seattle to the seat to which he had nominated Durham, and Tallman was confirmed in 2000.

While he was never formally nominated to the United States Court of Appeals for the District of Columbia Circuit, Peter Edelman was strongly considered by Clinton for a seat on that appeals court in late 1994.  After the influential Republican member of the U.S. Senate Judiciary Committee Sen. Orrin Hatch informed Clinton that he had intended to oppose Edelman's nomination, Clinton dropped plans to nominate Edelman to the D.C. Circuit, choosing Merrick Garland instead.

In its November 1997 issue, the American Spectator reported that President Clinton had intended to nominate Teresa Wynn Roseborough in 1997 to a vacant seat on the United States Court of Appeals for the Eleventh Circuit after Judge Phyllis A. Kravitch took senior status.  The American Spectator noted, however, that Sen. Orrin Hatch, the then-chairman of the U.S. Senate Judiciary Committee, had "balked" at the idea of Roseborough, who was one of four finalists (the others were Leah Ward Sears, Clarence Cooper and Frank M. Hull) and had "suggested that a more moderate Clinton-appointed U.S. district judge, Frank Hull, would have clear sailing."  Indeed, Frank M. Hull was confirmed by the Senate in a 96-0 vote in September 1997.

Failed district court nominees 

During his presidency, Clinton nominated 45 people for 42 different federal district judgeships to federal district courts who were never confirmed by the U.S. Senate.  Like the appellate court nominations mentioned above, many of these nominees were blocked by Republicans either in the Senate Judiciary Committee, which was controlled by Republicans for six of the eight years of Clinton’s presidency, or on the Senate floor, where one nominee, Ronnie L. White, was defeated by senators.

Of the 42 federal district judgeship vacancies in question, 17 eventually were filled with different Clinton nominees, 24 were filled by nominees of President George W. Bush and one never ended up becoming vacant because the district judge holding it never received confirmation to be elevated to an appellate court.  Of Clinton's 45 failed district court nominees, four, Legrome D. Davis, David S. Cercone, Dolly M. Gee and Sue E. Myerscough, subsequently were nominated by Presidents George W. Bush and Barack Obama to federal district judgeships and then confirmed by the Senate.

The failed Clinton district court nominees:

United States District Court for the District of Puerto Rico
Anabelle Rodriguez (judgeship later filled by Clinton nominee Jay A. Garcia-Gregory)
United States District Court for the Northern District of New York
Clarence J. Sundram (judgeship later filled by Clinton nominee David N. Hurd)
United States District Court for the Eastern District of Pennsylvania
Frederica Massiah-Jackson, followed by Robert A. Freedberg (judgeship later filled by Clinton nominee Petrese B. Tucker)
Legrome D. Davis (judgeship later filled by Davis himself, when he was renominated by George W. Bush in 2002 and then confirmed by the Senate)
S. David Fineman (judgeship later filled by Bush nominee  Cynthia M. Rufe)
Stephen B. Lieberman (judgeship later filled by Bush nominee Timothy J. Savage)
United States District Court for the Middle District of Pennsylvania
Patrick J. Toole (judgeship later filled by Clinton nominee A. Richard Caputo)
United States District Court for the Western District of Pennsylvania
John H. Bingler, Jr., followed by Lynette Norton (judgeship later filled by Bush nominee Arthur J. Schwab)
David S. Cercone (judgeship was to become vacant when Judge Robert J. Cindrich was elevated to the United States Court of Appeals for the Third Circuit but Cindrich never was confirmed to that post before Clinton's presidency ended; Cercone later was nominated to a different seat in the Western District by Bush and then confirmed by the Senate)
Harry Litman (judgeship later filled by Bush nominee Joy Flowers Conti)
United States District Court for the Eastern District of North Carolina
J. Rich Leonard (judgeship later filled by Bush nominee James C. Dever III)
United States District Court for the Northern District of Texas
Cheryl B. Wattley (judgeship later filled by Clinton nominee Sam A. Lindsay)
Michael D. Schattman (judgeship later filled by Clinton nominee Barbara M. Lynn)
United States District Court for the Southern District of Texas
Ricardo Morado (judgeship later filled by Bush nominee Andrew S. Hanen)
United States District Court for the Northern District of Ohio
Steven D. Bell (judgeship later filled by Bush nominee John R. Adams)
United States District Court for the Central District of Illinois
Sue E. Myerscough (judgeship later filled by Clinton nominee Michael P. McCuskey) (Myerscough later renominated by President Obama to a different seat on the same court and confirmed in 2011)
United States District Court for the Northern District of Illinois
Jeffrey D. Colman (judgeship later filled by Clinton nominee Ronald A. Guzman)
United States District Court for the Southern District of Illinois
Wenona Y. Whitfield (judgeship later filled by Clinton nominee David R. Herndon)
United States District Court for the Eastern District of Missouri
Ronnie L. White (Nomination rejected by the Senate) (judgeship later filled by Bush nominee Henry Autrey; White later was nominated and confirmed to a different seat on the Eastern District by Obama)
United States District Court for the Western District of Missouri
Leland M. Shurin (judgeship later filled by Clinton nominee Gary A. Fenner)
United States District Court for the District of Nebraska
Steven E. Achelpohl (judgeship later filled by Bush nominee Laurie Smith Camp)
United States District Court for the Central District of California
R. Samuel Paz (judgeship later filled by Clinton nominee George H. King)
Dolly M. Gee (judgeship later filled by Bush nominee John F. Walter; Gee later was nominated and confirmed to a different seat on the Central District by Obama)
Fredric D. Woocher (judgeship later filled by Bush nominee Percy Anderson)
United States District Court for the Eastern District of California
Marian M. Johnston (judgeship later filled by Bush nominee Morrison C. England Jr.)
United States District Court for the Southern District of California
Judith D. McConnell (judgeship later filled by Clinton nominee Barry Ted Moskowitz)
Lynne R. Lasry (judgeship later filled by Clinton nominee Thomas J. Whelan)
United States District Court for the District of Hawaii
John S. W. Lim (judgeship later filled by Bush nominee John Michael Seabright)
United States District Court for the District of Idaho
John R. Tait (judgeship later filled by Clinton nominee Lynn Winmill)
United States District Court for the District of Montana
Richard W. Anderson (judgeship later filled by Bush nominee Sam E. Haddon)
United States District Court for the District of Nevada
Linda B. Riegle (judgeship later filled by Bush nominee Larry R. Hicks)
United States District Court for the District of Colorado
Patricia A. Coan (judgeship later filled by Bush nominee Robert E. Blackburn)
United States District Court for the District of Kansas
K. Gary Sebelius (judgeship later filled by Bush nominee Julie A. Robinson)
United States District Court for the Northern District of Oklahoma
Frank H. McCarthy (judgeship later filled by Bush nominee Claire Eagan)
United States District Court for the Western District of Oklahoma
Valerie K. Couch (judgeship later filled by Bush nominee Stephen P. Friot)
Melvin C. Hall (judgeship later filled by Bush nominee Joe L. Heaton)
United States District Court for the Northern District of Alabama
John D. Snodgrass (judgeship later filled by Clinton nominee Charles Lynwood Smith Jr.)
Kenneth O. Simon (judgeship later filled by Bush nominee Karon O. Bowdre)
United States District Court for the Southern District of Florida
Theodore Klein, followed by Bruce W. Greer (judgeship later filled by Clinton nominee Donald M. Middlebrooks)
United States District Court for the Northern District of Georgia
Gail S. Tusan (judgeship later filled by Clinton nominee Beverly B. Martin)
United States District Court for the District of Columbia
James W. Klein (judgeship later filled by Bush nominee John D. Bates)
Rhonda C. Fields (judgeship later filled by Bush nominee Reggie Walton)

See also
 United States federal judge
 Judicial appointment history for United States federal courts
 Deaths of United States federal judges in active service

Notes

References

https://web.archive.org/web/20051114151130/http://archives.cnn.com/2000/ALLPOLITICS/stories/05/06/clinton.judge/index.html
https://www.nytimes.com/2000/07/01/us/2000-campaign-vice-president-gore-praises-values-virtues-hispanics.html

judicial appointments
Clinton, Bill